Birmingham Crematorium is a Protestant crematorium in the Perry Barr district of Birmingham, England, designed by Frank Osborne and opened in 1903. A columbarium was added in 1928. The crematorium is now owned and operated by Dignity plc.

Opening 

Cremation was not declared legal in Great Britain until 1885, by precedent from the trial of William Price. Despite the opening of Woking Crematorium in 1878 and the passing of the Cremation Act 1902, which came into effect on 1 April 1903, it remained controversial, on religious grounds, in the first decade of the twentieth century. However, proposals to build a crematorium for the city of Birmingham, the ninth such facility in the United Kingdom, received support from Sir Oliver Lodge, Principal of the University of Birmingham, and were given the approval of the three local bishops: Edmund Knox (Coventry), Augustus Legge (Lichfield) and Charles Gore (Worcester) (Birmingham did not have its own bishop until 1905).

In a letter read at the opening ceremony, Bishop Gore wrote:

Similarly, Bishop Knox wrote that:

The ceremony was conducted by Sir Henry Thompson, first president of the Cremation Society of Great Britain. His address, wrote The Lancet:

It was his last public duty as the society's president; he died the following year, and was cremated at Golders Green Crematorium.

Built on a site previously known as Sheldon Coppice, alongside the A34 (Walsall Road), the Birmingham facility cost £7,000, and had furnaces designed by Messrs. Wilcox & Raikes. The architect was Frank Osborne.

The current porch replaces a smaller original.

A columbarium, detached from the main building, was completed in January 1928.

Current use 

The crematorium has been remodelled internally at least twice, the most recent occasion being in 2003. Pews were replaced by chairs, the wooden ceiling was painted, and a gallery over the area where the coffin rests (not resent when the crematorium was opened) was removed. Following this, a rededication service as led by the Bishop for Birmingham, John Sentamu.

The gardens host a Commonwealth War Graves Commission memorial commemorating three World War I and 64 World War II servicemen who were cremated at Perry Barr. Headstones mark the sites of the ashes of one of the 64, and a Czech soldier.

By the time of the centenary commemorations in October 2003, 136,000 funerals had been held.
 
The crematorium is now operated by Dignity plc and is still in active use.

Notable cremations 

A number of notable people have been cremated at Perry Barr. They include:

January 1943: Sir Henry Maybury, civil engineer.
29 September 1950: John Beard, former leader of the Workers' Union (ashes scattered at Rowton, Shropshire).
 .

References

External links 

 Official web page

Perry Barr
Crematoria in England
1903 establishments in England
Buildings and structures in Birmingham, West Midlands